Of the 2 Rhode Island incumbents, neither were re-elected.

Rhode Island switched to a general ticket for its two seats, instead of electing each one separately.  Only one candidate received a majority in the 1800 election, requiring an 1801 run-off election to choose a Representative for the second seat.

See also 
 List of United States representatives from Rhode Island
 United States House of Representatives elections, 1800 and 1801

References 

1800
Rhode Island
Rhode Island
United States House of Representatives
United States House of Representatives